Estline (sometimes spelled EstLine) was a Swedish-Estonian shipping company, owned jointly by Nordström & Thulin and the Estonian Government via Estonian Shipping Company (ESCO). Estline was founded in 1990, and had a 10 year exclusive right to the passenger traffic between Stockholm, Sweden and Tallinn, Estonia. On 28 September 1994, the flagship of the company, MS Estonia, sank in an autumn storm. In 1998, Nordström & Thulin left the joint venture, making Estline a fully owned Estonian shipping company. By the end of 2000, Estline´s ships were chartered by Tallink. Estline was officially declared bankrupt in the middle of year 2001.

Ships 
Not a complete list.

MS Nord Estonia, later MS Vana Tallinn (1990–1994) – Scrapped in Aliağa, Turkey, 2014
MS Estonia (1993–1994) – Sank 1994
MS Nord Neptunus, later MS Neptunia (1992–1999) – Scrapped in Aliağa, Turkey, 2007
MS Mare Balticum (1994–1996) – later MS Bluefort - Scrapped in Alang, India, 2021
MS Regina Baltica (1996–2000) – Now sails for Balearia
MS Baltic Kristina (1997–2000) – Now MS Rigel for Ventouris Ferries

References

Ferry companies of Estonia
Transport companies disestablished in 2001
Transport companies established in 1990
1990 establishments in Estonia
2001 disestablishments in Estonia
Companies based in Tallinn
Defunct shipping companies